Crown Records was a budget albums record label founded as a subsidiary of Modern Records in 1957. It has been the name of several different record labels, listed below.

Discography

Mono
{| class="wikitable collapsible collapsed"
! Mono albums
|-
| 
CLP-5001...v/a: A Rock 'n Roll Dance Party LP (1957), w/ Etta James, Marvin and Johnny, The Cadets, The Teen Queens, Jimmy Beasley, Joe Turner, Joe Houston, Little Clydie, The Jacks
CLP-5002...Stan Getz: Groovin' High LP (1957)
CLP-5003...Kay Starr/Erroll Garner: Singin' Kay Starr/Swingin' Erroll Garner LP (1957)
CLP-5004...Wardell Gray: Way Out Wardell LP (1957)
CLP-5005...Don Dick 'n Jimmy: Spring Fever LP (1957)
CLP-5006...Joe Houston: Rocks and Rolls All Nite Long LP (1957)
CLP-5007...Vido Musso: The Swingin'st LP (1957)
CLP-5008...Jazz Surprise! LP (1957)
CLP-5009...Modern Jazz Stars: Jazz Masquerade LP (1957)
CLP-5010...Hadda Brooks: Femme Fatale LP (1957)
CLP-5011...v/a: Hollywood Rock 'n Roll Record Hop LP (1957), Cadets, Shirley Gunter, Jacks, Joe Houston, Dolly Cooper, Etta James, Marvin and Johnny, Cliques, Young Jessie, Joe Turner
CLP-5012...Red Callender: Callender Speaks Low LP (1957)
CLP-5013...v/a: Stars of Rock 'N Roll LP (1957)
CLP-5014...Jimmy Beasley: Fabulous LP (1957)
CLP-5015...Cadets: Rockin' n' Reelin' LP (1957)
CLP-5016...Oscar McLollie and His Honey Jumpers: Oscar McLollie and His Honey Jumpers LP (probably unissued)
CLP-5017...Three Tops: Dinner Time LP (1957)
CLP-5018...Don Ralke Orchestra and Singers: Very Truly Yours LP (1957)
CLP-5019...Don Ralke: Bongo Madness LP (1957)
CLP-5020...B.B. King: Singin' the Blues LP (1957)
CLP-5021...The Jacks: Jumpin' with the Jacks LP (1957)
CLP-5022...Teen Queens: Eddie My Love LP (1957)
CLP-5023...Betty Staples: Organ Fantasy In Hi-Fi LP (1957)
CLP-5024...Willard McDaniel: '88' a la Carte LP (1957)
CLP-5025...Red Callender with Buddy Collette: Swingin' Suite LP (1957)
CLP-5026...Phil Martin Orchestra: String of Pearls LP (1957)
CLP-5027...Phil Martin Orchestra: For Swingin' Dancers LP (1957)
CLP-5028...Aaron Collins: Calypso, U.S.A. LP (1957)
CLP-5029...Vido Musso Orchestra: Teen Age Dance Party LP (1957)
CLP-5030...Hans Hagan Orchestra: Around the World In 80 Days LP (1957)
CLP-5031...Louis Polliemon/Lord Preston Epps: Calypso Trinidad LP (1957)
CLP-5032...Eddie Gomez and His Latin American Orchestra: Cuban Mist Cha Cha Cha LP (1957)
CLP-5033...Hollywood Studio Orchestra: Music from Great Motion Picture Hits LP (1957)
CLP-5034...Dean Lester and Orchestra: Salute to the Big Bands LP (1957)
CLP-5035...Hans Hagen Conducting the Viennese  Orchestra: Beautiful Strauss Waltzes from Vienna LP (1957)
CLP-5036...Oklahoma! LP (1957), studio cast
CLP-5037...The Crazy Guy: Honky Tonk Piano LP (1957)
CLP-5038...12 Top Hits LP (1957), studio group
CLP-5039...Dean Lester and His Orchestra: Saturday Nite Date LP (1957)
CLP-5040...Doug Elliott: Songs Jolson Made Famous LP (1957)
CLP-5041...Stephen Foster Melodies LP (1957), studio group
CLP-5042...My Fair Lady LP (1957), studio cast
CLP-5043...Eddie Gomez Orchestra: Caribbean Rendezvous LP (1957)
CLP-5044...The Polynesians: Aloha Hawaii LP (1957)
CLP-5045...Kings of Dixieland: Fantabulous Kings of Dixieland LP (1957)
CLP-5046...Jon Trevanni and his Continental Orchestra: I'm in the Nude for Love LP (1957)
CLP-5047...Members of the Dorsey Orchestra: A Toast To Tommy and Jimmy Dorsey LP (1957)
CLP-5048...Pierre Legendre & Paris International Orchestra: Paris Nite Life LP (1957)
CLP-5049...Ivan Dittmars: Joy To the World LP (1957)
CLP-5050...Maxwell Davis: Tribute To Glenn Miller LP (1957)
CLP-5051...Nelson Riddle and Billy May: Bob Savage Carries the Torch LP (1957)
CLP-5052...Anton Paulik: Vienna Nite Life LP (1957)
CLP-5053...Duke Hazlett with Orchestra conducted by Tom Davis & Hans Hagan: Pal Joey LP (1957)
CLP-5054...Hans Hagan Orchestra: South Pacific LP (1958)
CLP-5055...Alex Pulaski and the Polka Dots: Polka Parade LP (1958)
CLP-5056...v/a: Jazz Confidential LP (1958)
CLP-5057...Paul Sykes: Great American Folk Songs LP (1958)
CLP-5058...Pete Johnson and Hadda Brooks: Swings the Boogie LP (1958)
CLP-5059...Vienna World Symphony: Brahms First Symphony LP (1958)
CLP-5060...Luiz Jiminez: Fury of the Brave Bulls LP (1958)
CLP-5061...Vienna Pro Arte Orchestra: Scheherazade LP (1958)
CLP-5062...The Music Man LP (1958), studio group
CLP-5063...B.B. King: The Blues LP (1958), reissue of early '50s 45s
CLP-5064...Bernie Anders Orchestra: Gigi LP (1958)
CLP-5065...International Symphony Orchestra: Peer Gynt Suite LP (1958)
CLP-5066...Vienna Pro Arte Orchestra: L'arlesienne Suites 1 and 2 LP (1958)
CLP-5067...International Symphony Orchestra: Nutcracker Suite LP (1958)
CLP-5068...Les Howard Orchestra: In the Miller Mood LP (1958)
CLP-5069...Johnny O'Toole & His "Naughty Naughty Band": The Gay 90s LP (1958)
CLP-5070...Billy Randolph & the High Hatters: Roaring 20's LP (1958)
CLP-5071...International Symphony Orchestra: Don Juan and Capricco-Espagnol LP (1958)
CLP-5072...Dance, Dance, Dance LP (1958), studio group
CLP-5073...Music Made Famous By Glenn Miller LP (1958), studio group
CLP-5074...Dean Lester Orchestra: Saturday Nite Date LP (1958)
CLP-5075...All Time Kiddie Favorites LP (1958)
CLP-5076...Vienna World Pops Symphony: Symphony of the Sea LP (1958)
CLP-5077...The Brussels World's Fair Pops Symphony Orchestra: Buddy Bregman Presents Symphony of the Golden West LP (1958)
CLP-5078...Vienna World Pops Symphony: Symphony of the Blues LP (1958)
CLP-5079...Wilhelm Strauss/Igor Kousevsky conducting the International Symphony Orchestra: Tchaikovsky Concerto No. 1 LP (1958)
CLP-5080...Hawaiians: Holiday In Hawaii LP (1958)
CLP-5081...Johnny Cole and the Robert Evans Chorus: Christmas Carols LP (1958)
CLP-5082...Brass Swingin' Band LP (1958), studio group
CLP-5083...Kiddies Christmas LP (1958), studio group
CLP-5084...Johnny Cole and Robert Evans Chorus: Hymns LP (1958)
CLP-5085...Port of Suez: Exotic Music of the Middle East LP (1958), studio group, mostly same as Mohammed El-Sulieman and His Oriental Ensemble: The Music of Port Said LP (Coronet, 1959?), East of Suez LP (Broadway), and Ali Beirut's Orientales: Music of the Near East LP (Pirouette)
CLP-5086...William Daly: Merry Christmas LP (1958)
CLP-5087...College Songs LP (1958), studio group
CLP-5088...Dean Lester: Champagne Music for Dancing LP (1958)
CLP-5089...The Crazy Guy: Honky Tonk Piano Volume 2 LP (1958)
CLP-5090...Members of Benny Goodman Orchestra & Brussels World's Fair Orchestra: Salute Benny Goodman LP (1959)
CLP-5091...William Daly: Organ Rhapsody LP (1959)
CLP-5092...Members Goodman Orchestra: Salute to Benny Goodman LP (1959)
CLP-5093...Salute to Stan Kenton LP (1959)
CLP-5094...Members of the Charlie Barnet Orchestra: A Tribute to Charlie Barnet in Hi-Fi LP (1959)
CLP-5095...OST: The Moon Is Blue LP (1959)
CLP-5096...Louis Martinelli Continentals: Cocktails for Two LP (1959)
CLP-5097...Members Goodman Orchestra: A Toast to Benny Goodman LP (1959)
CLP-5098...Kiddies Singing Stories and Games LP (1959), studio group
CLP-5099...Kiddies' Singing Storbook LP (1959), studio group
CLP-5100...Songs of Kiddie Land LP (1959), studio group
CLP-5101...Ted Nash and Orchestra: Peter Gunn TV Themes by Mancini LP (1959)
CLP-5102...Members Shaw Orchestra: Tribute to Artie Shaw LP (1959)
CLP-5103...Maxwell Davis: Tribute to Woody Herman LP (1959)
CLP-5104...Dave Nogell Conducting the Hollywood Studio Orchestra and Chorus: Porgy and Bess LP (1959)
CLP-5105...Johnny Cross Quartet: Flower Drum Song LP (1959)
CLP-5106...Members of the Perez Prado Orchestra: Mambo Jambo LP (1959)
CLP-5107...Maxwell Davis: Compositions of Lionel Hampton LP (1959)
CLP-5108...Johnny Cole: Sings Dreams of Italy LP (1959)
CLP-5109...Jose Barroso: Flamenco LP (1959)
CLP-5110...Milt Raskin: Kapu (Forbidden) LP (1959)
CLP-5111...Members of the Count Basie Orchestra: Compositions of Count Basie and Others LP (1959)
CLP-5112...The Ink Spots: Greatest Hits LP (1959)
CLP-5113...A Tribute to George M. Cohen LP (1959), studio group
CLP-5114...Charlie Barnet: A Tribute To Harry James LP (1959)
CLP-5115...B.B. King: Wails LP (1959)
CLP-5116...Thousand Strings Orchestra: Your Invitation to Stereo LP (1959)
CLP-5117...Sing Along LP (1959), studio group
CLP-5118...The Mighty Pipe Organ LP (1959), studio group
CLP-5119...B.B. King: Sings Spirituals LP (1959)
CLP-5120...The Hamburg Philharmonic Orchestra & Karl Jergens: 1812 Overture/Warsaw Concerto LP (1959)
CLP-5121...Johnny Williams & the Singing Cowboys: A Tribute To Hank Williams LP (1959)
CLP-5122...Nearer To God LP (1959), studio group
CLP-5123...Memories of Glenn Miller LP (1959), studio group
CLP-5124...Ravel's Bolero Tchaikovsky's March Slav LP (1959), studio group
CLP-5125...Vienna  Orchestra: Beautiful Viennese Waltzes LP (1959)
CLP-5126...Exciting Sounds of the Name Bands LP (1959), studio group
CLP-5127...Charlie Barnet: Charlie Barnet Presents a Salute To Harry James LP (1959)
CLP-5128...Night In Madrid LP (1959), studio group
CLP-5129...Kings of Dixieland: Volume Two LP (1959)
CLP-5130...The Polynesians: Blue Hawaii LP (1959)
CLP-5131...1000 Strings: Play for Christmas LP (1959)
CLP-5132...Johnny Cole and His Chorus: Wishing You a Merry Christmas LP (1959)
CLP-5133...La Tino Cha Cha Cha LP (1959), studio group
CLP-5134...Charlie Barnet: On Stage with Charlie Barnet LP (1959)
CLP-5135...The Sound of Music LP (1959), studio group
CLP-5136...The Polynesians: Polynesia LP (1959), reissued as Chango and the Polynesians: Polynesian Percussion (Premier/Directional Sound, DS 5012, 1961)
CLP-5137...New World Symphony LP (1959), studio group
CLP-5138...Manuel Rivera and His Orchestra: Dance Tempo Cha Cha Cha LP (1959)
CLP-5139...Kings of Dixieland: Kings of Dixieland Volume 3 LP (1959)
CLP-5140...Maxwell Davis Conducting Members of Their Great Orchestras: Exciting Sounds of the Name Bands Volume Two LP (1959)
CLP-5141...George Liberace: Dine and Dance LP (1959)
CLP-5142...Ink Spots: Ink Spots LP (1959)
CLP-5143...B.B. King: The Great B.B. King LP (1960)
CLP-5144...v/a: Best of the Oldies and Goodies LP (1959)
CLP-5145...Jesse Belvin: The Casual Jesse Belvin LP (1959)
CLP-5146...The Latin Touch LP (1960), studio group
CLP-5147...The Grand Canyon Suite LP (1960), studio group
CLP-5148...Can Can LP (1960)
CLP-5149...Beethoven's Fifth Symphony LP (1960), studio group
CLP-5150...Heart of Spain LP (1960), studio group
CLP-5151...George Liberace: George Liberace Goes Latin..... LP (1960)
CLP-5152...I Remember Paris LP (1960), studio group
CLP-5153...Maxwell Davis & B.B. King: Compositions of Duke Ellington and Others LP (1960)
CLP-5154...Schubert: Unfinished Symphony, Symphony #3 LP (1960), studio group
CLP-5155...Polka Party LP (1960), studio group
CLP-5156...Jimmy Witherspoon: Jimmy Witherspoon LP (1960)
CLP-5157...John Lee Hooker: The Blues LP (1960)
CLP-5158...Rex Trailer and the Playboys: Country and Western LP (1960)
CLP-5159...Latin All Stars: Jazz Heat Bongo Beat LP (1960)
CLP-5160...The Crazy Guy: Barrel House Piano LP (1960)
CLP-5161...Bizet's Carmen Suite Schumann Manfred Overture LP (1960), studio group
CLP-5162...Conte Candoli All Stars: Little Band Big Jazz LP (1960)
CLP-5163...Voices of Hawaii: The Magic of Hawaii LP (1960)
CLP-5164...Tito Guererra: Arriba LP (1960)
CLP-5165...Louis Martinelli and the Continentals: L'amore D'Italia LP (1960)
CLP-5166..Sounds of a Thousand Strings: Cloud Nine LP (1960)
CLP-5167...B.B. King: King of the Blues LP (1960)
CLP-5168...Elmore James and the Broom Dusters: Blues After Hours LP (1960)
CLP-5169...Round Up Time for the Kiddies LP (1960), studio group
CLP-5170...Billy Boyd: Twangy Guitars LP (1960)
CLP-5171...Louis Martinelli and the Continentals: Latin Twist LP (1960)
CLP-5172...Lilie Wollin: Chopin Favorites LP (1960)
CLP-5173...1000 Strings: Music for Big Dame Hunters LP (1960)
CLP-5174...Harmonica Hot Shots: Harmonica Favorites LP (1960)
CLP-5175...Pee Wee Crayton: Pee Wee Crayton LP (1960)
CLP-5176...Members Dorsey Orchestra: Tribute to Tommy Dorsey LP (1960)
CLP-5177...Gypsy Love Songs LP (1960), studio group
CLP-5178...Liberace: Ooh La La LP (1960)
CLP-5179...Sterling Blythe: Sings LP (1960)
CLP-5180...Woody Herman: The New Swingin' Herman Herd LP (1960)
CLP-5181...Coleman Hawkins: Coleman Hawkins and His Orchestra LP (1960)
CLP-5182...Kings of Dixieland: Kings of Dixieland Volume 4 LP (1960)
CLP-5183...Chubby Jackson: Chubby Jackson Discovers Maria Marshall LP (1960)
CLP-5184...Los Cinco Caballeros: Latin Hurricane LP (1960)
CLP-5185...Swan Lake Ballet LP (1960), studio group
CLP-5186...Johnny Williams and the Playboys: A Salute to Hank Williams LP (1960)
CLP-5187...Jesse Belvin: The Unforgettable Jesse Belvin LP (1961)
CLP-5188...B.B. King: My Kind of Blues LP (1961)
CLP-5189...Milt Raskin: Exotic Percussion LP (1961)
CLP-5190...1000 Strings: The Heart of Spain, Vol. 2 LP (1961)
CLP-5191...The Polynesians: Beautiful Hawaii LP (1961)
CLP-5192...Jimmy Witherspoon: Sings the Blues LP (1961)
CLP-5193...Percussion All Stars: Predominant Percussion LP (1961)
CLP-5194...Smith Singers: Christmas Carols LP (1961)
CLP-5195...Sing Along Christmas Carols LP (1961), studio group
CLP-5196...Fred Kirby: Christmas Favorites LP (1961)
CLP-5197...Ink Spots: Sensational Ink Spots LP (1961)
CLP-5198...George Liberace and His Orchestra: Hawaiian Paradise LP (1961)
CLP-5199...Hamburg Philharmonic: Gaite Parisienne LP (1961)
CLP-5200...Kings of Dixieland: Kings of Dixieland Volume 5 LP (1961)
CLP-5201...Jim Day: Organ Favorites LP (1961)
CLP-5202...v/a: More Oldies and Goodies LP (1961)
CLP-5203...Joe Houston: Wild Man of the Tenor Sax LP (1961)
CLP-5204...Rudy Vallée: Is This Your Rudy Vallée? LP (1961)
CLP-5205...Drink-a-Long Sing-a-Long Gang LP (1961), studio group
CLP-5206...The Polynesians: Hawaii Calling LP (1961)
CLP-5207...Coleman Hawkins: The Hawk Swings LP (1961)
CLP-5208...Lillie Wollin: Moonlight Sonata LP (1961)
CLP-5209...Etta James: Miss Etta James LP (1961)
CLP-5210...Rev. Ulric George and The Jubilee Singers: Spirituals LP (1961)
CLP-5211...Camp Fire Sing-a-Long Gang LP (1961)
CLP-5212...The Continental Octette: Modern Jazz Greats LP (1961)
CLP-5213...v/a: Oldies and Goodies Country & Western #1 LP (1961)
CLP-5214...Hawaiians: Vacation in Hawaii (1961)
CLP-5215...The Polka Dots: Polka Time LP (1961)
CLP-5216...?
CLP-5217...Ink Spots: The Sensational Ink Spots LP (1961)
 (Duplicate Number) CLP-5217 The Princeton Trio by The Princeton Trio (mono)
CLP-5218...?
CLP-5219...Sing-A-Long Gang: Naughty Sing-A-Long Party (1961)
CLP-5220...Continental Octette: Modern Jazz Greats Vol. 2 LP (1961?)
CLP-5221...Ink Spots: More Ink Spots LP (1961?)
CLP-5222...v/a: Oldies and Goodies: Country and Western Vol. II LP (1961)
CLP-5223...Sounds of a Thousand Strings: Musical Memories (1961)
CLP-5224...Lightnin' Hopkins: Lightning Hopkins Sings the Blues LP (1961)
CLP-5225...Billy Randolph & The High Hatters: Roaring 20's LP (1961?)
CLP-5226...Smokey Hogg: Sings the Blues LP (1961)
CLP-5227...v/a: Rock N Roll Party Oldies But Goodies LP (1961?)
CLP-5228...Eddie Dean: Hillbilly Heaven LP (1961?)
CLP-5229...Crazy Guy: Honky Tonk Piano LP (1961?)
CLP-5230...B.B. King: More B.B. King LP (1961)
CLP-5231...Tony Allen and the Night Owls: Rock 'n Roll LP (1961)
CLP-5232...John Lee Hooker: Sittin' Here Thinkin' LP (1961)
CLP-5233...Rex Wells: Gunfighter Ballads LP (1961)
CLP-5234...Etta James: The Best of Etta James LP (1961)
CLP-5235...The Rounders: Square Dance with Call LP (1961?)
CLP-5236...Sister Rosetta Tharpe: Sister Rosetta Tharpe LP (1961?)
CLP-5237...Rudy Macias and His Charanga Orchestra: Pachanga If You Please LP (1961?)
CLP-5238...v/a: Blues Oldies and Goodies LP (1961)
CLP-5239...The Kirby Stone Four and the Sportsmen: Happy Sing-a-Long LP (1961?)
CLP-5240...Howlin' Wolf: Howling Wolf Sings the Blues LP (1962)
CLP-5241...v/a: Oldies and Goodies: Country and Western, Volume 3 LP (1961)
CLP-5242...v/a: Oldies and Goodies Volume 3 LP (1961)
CLP-5243...v/a: Oldies and Goodies Country and Western Vol. 4 LP (1961)
CLP-5244...Jimmy McCracklin: Twist with Jimmy McCracklin LP (1962)
CLP-5245...Teddy Reynolds and the Twisters: The Twist LP (1962)
CLP-5246...Joe Houston: Doin' the Twist LP (1962)
CLP-5247...Jimmy Beasley: Twist with Jimmy Beasley LP (1962)
CLP-5248...B.B. King: Twist with B.B. King LP (1962)
CLP-5249...v/a: Peppermint Twist LP (1962)
CLP-5250...Etta James: Twist With Etta James LP (1962)
CLP-5251...Steve Douglas: Twist with Steve Douglas and the Rebels LP (1962)
CLP-5252...Joe Houston: Twisting in Orbit LP (1962?)
CLP-5253...?
CLP-5254...Steve Douglas and the Rebel Rousers: Popeye Twist and Stomp LP (1962)
CLP-5255...Mike Adams and the Red Jackets: Twist Contest LP (1962)
CLP-5256...Eddie Dean: Hillbilly Heaven LP (1962?)
CLP-5257...?
CLP-5258...Eddie Dean: Hillbilly Heaven LP (1962?)
CLP-5259...?
CLP-5260...Sounds of a Thousand Strings: Just for Listening (1962)
CLP-5261...Manuel Rivera & His Orchestra: Latin Dances and Rhythms (1962)
CLP-5262...?
CLP-5263...Kings of Dixieland: Kings of Dixieland, Volume 7 (1962)
CLP-5264...Doye O'Dell: Country Time LP (1962)
CLP-5265...The Polynesians featuring Harry Baty, Sam Kaapuni & Bob Nichols: Lovely Hawaii (1962)
CLP-5266...The Frontiersmen: Country Jamboree LP (1962)
CLP-5267...?
CLP-5268...Kay Starr and the Gerald Wiggins Trio: Kay Starr and the Gerald Wiggins Trio LP (1962)
CLP-5269...The Polka Dots: Polka Chips LP (1962?)
CLP-5270...Chris Christian: Organ Encores
CLP-5271...Polynesians: Hawaiian Paradise
CLP-5272...?
CLP-5273...Joe Houston: Rockin and Rollin LP (1962?)
CLP-5274...Juan Manuel con El Mariachi: Canciones Mexicanas
CLP-5275...Erroll Garner and The Maxwell Davis Trio LP (1962?)
CLP-5276...Larry Caldwell with Speedy Price and the Saddle Tramps: The Country Gentlemen LP (1962)
CLP-5277...Billy Lee Riley: Harmonica and the Blues LP (1962)
CLP-5278...Wardell Gray: Way Out Wardell LP (1962)
CLP-5279...Sundowners: Folk Song LP (1962)
CLP-5280...Trio Acapulco: The Heart of Mexico
CLP-5281...Marvin and Johnny: Marvin and Johnny LP (1962)
CLP-5282...Wally Fernez: Latin Heat Wave
CLP-5283...?
CLP-5284...v/a: Groovin' High LP (1962)
CLP-5285...Frank Ovanin, the Banjo Man: Banjo Party
CLP-5286...B.B. King: Easy Listening Blues LP (1962)
CLP-5287...Roosevelt Sykes: Sings the Blues LP (1963)
CLP-5288...Dave Brubeck Quartet/Paul Desmond Quartet/Cal Tjader: Dave Brubeck Quartet/Paul Desmond Quartet/Cal Tjader LP (1963?), "Jazz Latino" track is the retitled "Bill B" from the Cal Tjader Quartet LP Jazz at the Blackhawk (Fantasy, 1/20/57 session)
CLP-5289...Gerry Mulligan—Chet Baker—Chico Hamilton—Buddy Collette—Gerald Wiggins: Gerry Mulligan—Chet Baker—Chico Hamilton—Buddy Collette—Gerald Wiggins LP (1963)
CLP-5290...Johnny Horton: Country Style with Billy Barton and Don Hughes LP (1963?)
CLP-5291...Jimmy Dean and the Western Gentlemen: Jimmy Dean and the Western Gentlemen LP (1963?)
CLP-5292...Sonny Criss/Gerald Wiggins/Erroll Garner/Stan Getz: Sonny Criss, Gerald Wiggins, Erroll Garner, and Stan Getz
CLP-5293...Erroll Garner / Wardell Gray / Barney Kessel / Gerald Wiggins LP (1963?)
CLP-5294...v/a: King Curtis, Etta James, Jessie Belvin and Others LP (1963)
CLP-5295...John Lee Hooker: Folk Blues LP (1963)
CLP-5296...Trio Acapulco: Viva Mexico LP (1963?)
CLP-5297...Trio Los Tajuarines: Old Mexico
CLP-5298...?
CLP-5299...Trio Los Tijuarines: A Night in Mexico
CLP-5300...?
CLP-5301...Polynesians: Hawaiian Memories
CLP-5302...Buddy Collette/Howard Roberts/Jim Helms/Mel Pollan/Lee Acosta/Darien: Bossa Nova
CLP-5303...Ray Charles and Jimmy Witherspoon: Ray Charles Meets Jimmy Witherspoon LP (1963)
CLP-5304...Richard Kauhi and the Polynesians: Hawaiian Sunset LP (1963?)
CLP-5305...Lester Young: Nat "King: Cole Meets Lester Young LP (1963)
CLP-5306...Foy Willing and the Riders of the Purple Sage: Cool Water LP (1963)
CLP-5307...Marvin Rainwater: Marvin Rainwater LP (1963)
CLP-5308...Jimmy Dean/Billy Cotton and the Western Gentlemen: The Fabulous Jimmy Dean LP (1963)
CLP-5309...B.B. King: Blues in My Heart LP (1963)
CLP-5310...Chico Hamilton with Paul Horn: Chico Hamilton with Paul Horn LP (1963)
CLP-5311...Bud Shank: Bud Shank LP (1963)
CLP-5312...Mike Adams and The Red Jackets: Surfers Beat LP (1963)
CLP-5313...Joe Houston: Surf Rockin' LP (1963)
CLP-5314...Don Dailey: Surf Stompin' LP (1963)
CLP-5315...Alex Keack: Surfers Paradise LP (1963?)
CLP-5316...William Rodgers: Cleopatra LP (1963?)
CLP-5317...Chet Baker Quintette: Chet Baker Quintette LP (1963)
CLP-5318...Bob Brookmeyer: Featuring John Williams & Red Mitchell LP (1963?)
CLP-5319...Joe Houston: Limbo LP (1963)
CLP-5320...Eddie Dean: The Golden Cowboy
CLP-5321...Al Terry and Johnny Tyler: Country Music Stars LP (1963)
CLP-5322...Billy Sherman: The Folk Singer
CLP-5323...Tommy Roe and Bobby Lee: Tommy Roe and Bobby Lee LP (1963)
CLP-5324..."Tex: Carmen: "Tex" Carmen LP (1963)
CLP-5325...Sonny James & Eddie Wills: Country Style LP (1963 or 1964)
CLP-5326...Phil Campos & Paul Hansen: Famous Folk Songs LP (1963?)
CLP-5327...Johnny Williams & Playboys: The Era of Hank Williams
CLP-5328...Carlisle Minstrels: Hootenanny Folk Songs LP (1963?)
CLP-5329...Jimmy Newman: Guest Star of the Grand Old Opry LP (1963)
CLP-5330...v/a: C and W Jamboree LP (1963)
CLP-5331...Guest Stars of the Grand Old Opry LP (1963?)
CLP-5332...Whitey Pullen: Country Music Star LP (1963)
CLP-5333...Ray "Ahab the Arab" Stevens and Hal Winters: Ray "Ahab the Arab" Stevens and Hal Winters LP (1963)
CLP-5334...Casey Clark & Evelyn Harlene: In Memorial to Lonnie Baron LP (1963)
CLP-5335...Ral Donner Ray Smith & Bobby Dale: Ral Donner Ray Smith & Bobby Dale LP (1963)
CLP-5336...Ritchie Valens/Jerry Kole: Ritchie Valens & Jerry Kole LP (1963)
CLP-5337...The Wear Family: Blue Grass Gospels LP (1963?)
CLP-5338...Joe Reagan: A Tribute to Grand Ole Opry Star Cowboy Copas LP (1963?)
CLP-5339...Pearl Bailey & Sylvia Lynn: Pearl Bailey & Sylvia Lynn LP (1963?)
CLP-5340...Wade Holmes: Tribute to Hawkshaw Hawkins LP (1963)
CLP-5341...Chico Hamilton/Paul Horn: The Great Chico Hamilton Featuring Paul Horn LP (1963)
CLP-5342...Holly Lane: A Tribute to Patsy Cline LP (1963?)
CLP-5343...Vic Damone and Johnny Cole LP (1963?)
CLP-5344...G.M. Farley & Foggy River Boys: Country Gospel
CLP-5345...Johnny Desmond and Norman Brooks: Johnny Desmond and Norman Brooks LP (1963?)
CLP-5346...The Scottsville Squirrel Barkers: Blue Grass Favorite LP (1963), reissued as *CLP-5444 with different artist name and title
CLP-5347...Mel Tormé: Mel Tormé with Robert Alda and Caesar Romero LP (1963)
CLP-5348...John Foster: Theme from Lawrence of Arabia LP (1963?)
CLP-5349...Trini Lopez: Trini Lopez LP (1963)
CLP-5350...Brook Benton/Jessie Belvin: Brook Benton and Jessie Belvin LP (1963)
CLP-5351...Mason Williams: More Hootenanny LP (1963)
CLP-5352...Isley Bros./Marvin and Johnny: Isley Bros. and Marvin and Johnny LP (1963)
CLP-5353...John Lee Hooker: The Great John Lee Hooker LP (1963)
CLP-5354...Chuck Jackson & Young Jessie: Chuck Jackson & Young Jessie LP (1963)
CLP-5355...Don Gardner Trio: Featuring Jimmy Smith and Bill Davis LP (1963)
CLP-5356... Flairs: Flairs Featuring Cornel Gunter, Richard Berry and Young Jessie LP (1963)
CLP-5357...Dave "Baby" Cortez and Jerry's House Rockers: Dave "Baby" Cortez and Jerry's House Rockers LP (1963)
CLP-5358...Bobby Blue Bland/Jimmy Soul/Johnny Watson: Bobby Blue Bland, Jimmy Soul and Johnny Watson LP (1963)
CLP-5359...B.B. King: B.B. King LP (1963)
CLP-5360...Etta James: Etta James LP (1963)
CLP-5361...v/a: The Greats! LP (1963?), Dave Brubeck, Paul Desmond, Bobby Correll, Bob Kindle, Frank Blake
CLP-5362...Little Richard: Sings Freedom Songs LP (1963)
CLP-5363...Jerry Mulligan: The Great Jerry Mulligan LP (1963)
CLP-5364...Ray Smith/Pat Cupp: Ray Smith and Pat Cupp LP (1963)
CLP-5365...?
CLP-5366...Neil Sedaka and the Tokens and Coins: Neil Sedaka and the Tokens and Coins LP (1963)
CLP-5367...Ike Turner: Rocks the Blues LP (1963)
CLP-5368...Del Vikings/Sonnets: Del Vikings and the Sonnets LP (1963)
CLP-5369...Lightning Hopkins: Lightning Hopkins LP (1963?)
CLP-5370...Cadets: Cadets LP (1963)
CLP-5371...Richard Berry & the Dreamers: Richard Berry & the Dreamers LP (1963)
CLP-5372...The Jacks: Jumpin' with the Jacks LP (1963)
CLP-5373...The Teen Queens: The Teen Queens LP (1963)
CLP-5374...Hadda Brooks: Sings and Swings LP (1963)
CLP-5375...Gene Phillips and the Rockets: Gene Phillips and the Rockets LP (1963)
CLP-5376...Jimmy Gilmer and the Fireballs and the Sugar Shackers: Jimmy Gilmer and the Fireballs and the Sugar Shackers LP (1963)
CLP-5377...Jim Helms: 12 String Guitar
CLP-5378...The Hot Rodders: Big Hot Rod LP (1963)
CLP-5379...Silver Gate Singers: Ethnic Folk LP (1963?)
CLP-5380...Billie Holiday and Vivian Fears: Billie Holiday and Vivian Fears LP (1963)
CLP-5381...Marvin & Johnny: Marvin & Johnny LP (1963)
CLP-5382...Steve Alaimo: Steve Alaimo LP (1963)
CLP-5383...Joe Turner and Jimmy Nelson: Joe Turner and Jimmy Nelson LP (1963)
CLP-5384...Scramblers: Cycle Psychos LP (1963)
CLP-5385...Jerry Kole/Strokers: Hot Rod Alley LP (1963)
CLP-5386...v/a: Let's Have a Hootenanny LP (1963?)
CLP-5387...Jimmy Gilmer and the Fireballs: Sensational LP (1963)
CLP-5388...Bob Harrington Quartette: Jazz a la Carte LP (1960?)
CLP-5389...v/a: Let's Have a Hootenanny Vol. II LP (1963?), Scottsville, Squirrel Barkers, Phil Campos and Paul Hansen, The Hootenairs, Paul Sykes, The Silvergate Singers, Billy Sherman
CLP-5390...?
CLP-5391...v/a: Let's Have a Hootenanny Vol. 3 LP (1963?)
CLP-5392...The Blasters: Sounds of the Drags LP (1963)
CLP-5393...The Deuce Coupes/The Shut Downs: The Deuce Coupes/The Shut Downs LP (1963)
CLP-5394...The Winners: Checkered Flag LP (1963)
CLP-5395...Eddie Fisher and the Golden Strings: Tonite with LP (1963?)
CLP-5396...Eddie Fisher and the Golden Strings: An Evening with Eddie Fisher and the Golden Strings LP (1963?)
CLP-5397...A Memorial to John F. Kennedy LP (1963)
CLP-5398...A Memorial to John F. Kennedy LP (1963)
CLP-5399...B. Brock and the Sultans: Do the Beetle LP (1964)
CLP-5400...The Dave Clark Five and the Playbacks: The Dave Clark Five and the Playbacks LP (1964)
CLP-5401...
CLP-5402...Brook Benton/Jesse Belvin: The Great Jesse Belvin LP (1964)
CLP-5403...Alex Pulaski & the Polka Dots: Polka
CLP-5404...Erroll Garner/Maxwell Davis Trio: Mr. Erroll Garner and the Maxwell Davis Trio
CLP-5405...v/a: Blues Oldies and Goodies LP (1964)
CLP-5406...Dave Brubeck/Paul Desmond Quartet/Cal Tjader Quartet: At a Perfume Counter/Purple Moon/Jazz Latino LP (1964?)
CLP-5407...?
CLP-5408...Sonny Criss: Gerald Wiggins, Erroll Garner, Stan Getz LP (1964?)
CLP-5409...A Thousand Strings: Golden American Waltzes LP (1964?)
CLP-5410...?
CLP-5411...Gerry Mulligan: Chet Baker Chico Hamilton Buddy Collette Gerald Wiggins LP (1964)
CLP-5412...Nat King Cole & Lester Young: Nat King Cole & Lester Young LP (1964)
CLP-5413...Continental Jazz Oct.: Modern Jazz Great Vol. 1 LP (1964?)
CLP-5414...?
CLP-5415...Stan Getz/Erroll Garner/Sonny Criss/Buddy Collette: Stan Getz/Erroll Garner/Sonny Criss/Buddy Collette LP (1964?)
CLP-5416...Polynesians: Sweet Leilani
CLP-5417...Vince Guaraldi and the Conte Candoli All Stars: Vince Guaraldi and the Conte Candoli All Stars LP (1964?)
CLP-5418...Ray Charles and Jimmy Witherspoon: Mr. Ray Charles with Jimmy Witherspoon LP (1964)
CLP-5419...?
CLP-5420...Erroll Garner/Wardell Gray/Barney Kissell/Gerald Wiggins: Jazz
CLP-5421...?
CLP-5422...Jonah Jones/Etta Jones: Jonah Jones Swings/Etta Jones Sings LP (1964)
CLP-5423...Sounds of a Thousand Strings: Play Gypsy Play
CLP-5424...Wardell Gray/Erroll Garner: Wardell Gray Plus Erroll Garner
CLP-5425...Continental Jazz Octette: Modern Jazz Greats, Volume 2
CLP-5426...?
CLP-5427...v/a: Best of the Oldies and Goodies LP (1964)
CLP-5428...Studio Group: Viennese Waltz Time
CLP-5429...?
CLP-5430...Joe Reagan: Memory of Cowboy Copas
CLP-5431...The Wear Family: Blue Grass Gospel LP (1964?)
CLP-5432...Wade Holmes: The Memory of Hawkshaw Hawkins
CLP-5433...v/a: Country and Western Favorites LP (1964?)
CLP-5434...Eddie Dean: Sings LP (1958?)
CLP-5435...Billy Williams & the Westerners: Your Cheatin' Heart LP (19??)
CLP-5436...The Cavaliers: Smoke Gets in Your Eyes and Other Harmonica Favorites LP (1958?)
CLP-5437...Gino Costalani: Three Coins in the Fountain
CLP-5438...George Whiteman: George Whiteman at the Hammond Organ
CLP-5439...Johnny Cole & the Robert Evans Chorus: Songs of Inspiration LP (1958?)
CLP-5440...Studio Group: Theme from Goldfinger and Others
CLP-5441...Louis Martinelli & the Continentals: Arriverderci Roma LP (1958?)
CLP-5442...The Dixieland Scramblers: Dixieland: I Just Love It LP (196?)
CLP-5443...v/a: Golden Oldies Country and Western
CLP-5444...Kentucky Mountain Boys: The Best of Blue Grass Favorites LP (1964?), reissue of *CLP-5346 with different artist name and title, later reissued as Custom CS-1109
CLP-5445...The Frontiersmen: Country Jamboree LP (1964?)
CLP-5446...Polynesians: Beautiful Hawaii
CLP-5447...Barrel Fingers Barry: Beer Barrel Piano LP (1964?)
CLP-5448...The Ink Spots: If I Didn't Care LP (1964?)
CLP-5449...Discothèque! LP (1964?), studio band
CLP-5450...Favorites from Walt Disney's Mary Poppins LP (1964), studio band
CLP-5451...Buck Davis & the Singing Cowboys: A Hank Williams Tribute LP (1964?)
CLP-5452...Hollywood Studio Orchestra: Lerner and Lowe Favorites
CLP-5453...v/a: Engine, Engine Number 9 LP (1964)
CLP-5454...The Hawaiians: Hawaii Tattoo LP (1964)
CLP-5455...Don Ayers: Organ Rhapsody
CLP-5456...George Johnson & The Robert Evans Chorus: Theme From The Greatest Story Ever Told and Other Religious Hymns LP (1964?)
CLP-5457...v/a: Al Hirt The Dawn Busters & Cotton Candy/The Maxwell Davis Quintet LP (1964?)
CLP-5458...Trini Lopez/Johnny Tores: Trini Lopez with Johnny Tores LP (1964)
CLP-5459...Hank Mancini Favorites & Others LP (1964?)
CLP-5460...Buddy Collette: The Girl from Ipanema, I Left My Heart in San Francisco, Fly Me to the Moon and Other Favorites LP (1964?)
CLP-5461...Trumpet Virtuosos: Red Roses for a Blue Lady
CLP-5462...Barrell Fingers Barry: Honky Tonk Piano
CLP-5463...The Hollywood Studio Orchestra: Rodgers & Hammerstein's Favourites LP (1964)
CLP-5464...Dixieland Scramblers: The Best of Dixie
CLP-5465...Square Dance with Calls
CLP-5466...Alex Pulaski & the Polka Dots: Polka Parade
CLP-5467...Sterling Blythe: Ring Of Fire—Wolverton Mountain & Other Country and Western Hits LP (1964?)
CLP-5468...The Johnny Louis Trio: The In Crowd LP (1964)
CLP-5469...Don Gardner Trio: Featuring Jimmy Smith Plays LP (1964?)
CLP-5470...Dave Brubeck: Angel Eyes LP (1964)
CLP-5471...The Mexicali Brass: Whipped Cream LP (1964?)
CLP-5472...The Polynesians: Beautiful Blue Hawaii LP (1964?)
CLP-5473...The Dave Clark Five: Chaquita/In Your Heart LP (1964)
CLP-5474...Shenandoah Strings: Shenandoah
CLP-5475...Johnny Rivers and Jerry Cole: Johnny Rivers and Jerry Cole LP (1964)
CLP-5476...The Stingers: Guitars a Go Go LP (1964)
CLP-5477...Rube Rubin & the Westerners: Kansas City Star & King of the Road and Other Country & Western Hits LP (1964?)
CLP-5478...Pete Fountain & the Village Scramblers: Jazz LP (1964?)
CLP-5479...Grand Ole Square Dances with Calls
CLP-5480...Golden Goodies-Country and Western
CLP-5481...Trini Lopez: Plays & Sings Only in My Dreams • Rosita and Sinner Man LP (1964?)

CLP-5482...Barrel Fingers Barry: Beer Garden Piano: Barrel Fingers Barry Swings the Classics
CLP-5483...Red Rhodes: Guitars Go Country LP (1964)
CLP-5484...Rex Trailer & the Playboys: Good Old Country Music LP (1964?)
CLP-5485...Johnny Horton/Texas Slim & His Cowboys: Johnny Horton Sings
CLP-5486...Jesse Crawford: At the Organ LP (1964?)
CLP-5487...The Mexicali Brass: A Taste of Honey LP (1964?)
CLP-5488...Polynesians: Romantic Hawaii
CLP-5489...Jimmy Dean: Bummin' Around LP (1964)
CLP-5490...Members of the Glenn Miller Orchestra: In the Miller Mood
CLP-5491...Chris Christian: Organ Encores
CLP-5492...The Mexicali Brass: Downtown LP (1964?)
CLP-5493...John Yankowsky & the Polka Paraders: Polka Dots & Polka Chips
CLP-5494...Lee James & the Tennessee Wranglers: I Can't Stop Loving You and Other Instrumental Country & Western Hits LP (1964?)
CLP-5495...Muscrat Ramblers: Dixieland Jubilee
CLP-5496...Carl Miller & Playboys: I Walk the Line and Other Dobro Guitar Favorites LP (1964)
CLP-5497...Mexicali Brass: Zorba the Greek
CLP-5498...Hollywood Studio Orchestra: Theme from Doctor Zhivago
CLP-5499...Holiday Show Band: Winchester Cathedral
CLP-5500...Billy Bond: Music of the Wild Wild West
CLP-5501...Johnny Kilgore & Texas Ramblers: Room Full of Roses and Other Country Guitar Hits LP (1964?)
CLP-5502...Barrel Fingers Barry: Honky Tonkin' with Barrel Fingers Barry LP (196?)
CLP-5503...The Mexicali Brass: Michelle LP (196?)
CLP-5504...?
CLP-5505...Andy Jones & Plainsmen: No Letter Today
CLP-5506...The Mexicali Brass: Theme from Thunderball LP (196?)
CLP-5507...Johnny Mac: The Era of Hank Williams LP (1964?)
CLP-5508...Dave Dudley/Cass County Boys: Dave Dudley Sings with the Cass County Boys
CLP-5509...Maxwell Davis: Batman Theme and Other Bat Songs LP (1966?)
CLP-5510...Johnny Mac: Ballad of the Green Beret
CLP-5511...Mexicali Brass: What Now My Love
CLP-5512...Harold Hensley and The Virginia Mountaineers: Orange Blossom Special and Other Hoe Down Fiddle Favorites LP (1965?)
CLP-5513...Barrel Fingers Barry: Ragtime Piano
CLP-5514...Billy Hayden: Last Date and Other Country Piano Favorites
CLP-5515...William Daly: Organ Memories
CLP-5516...Billy Campbell: Make the World Go Away
CLP-5517...?
CLP-5518...Jerry Cole & the Country Boys: Crazy Arms and Other Country & Western Instrumental Favorites
CLP-5519...Polynesians: Hawaiian Love Songs
CLP-5520...Red Rhodes: Once a Day LP (1964)
CLP-5521...Norm Kass: Buckaroo and Other Country and Western Favorites
CLP-5522...Dominique from the "Singing Nun"
CLP-5523...Mexicali Brass: The Work Song
CLP-5524...Mexicali Brass: The Mexicali Brass Go South of the Border
CLP-5525...A Tribute To Tommy Dorsey LP (1964), studio group
CLP-5526...Georges Montalba: The Mighty Pipe Organ
CLP-5527...Let's Dance: A Tribute to Benny Goodman Members Of The Benny Goodman Orchestra (1964)
CLP-5528...Red Rhodes and The Road Runners: Blue Blue Day LP (196?)
CLP-5529...Members of Glenn Miller's Orchestra: A String of Pearls: A Tribute to Glenn Miller
CLP-5530...Harold Hensley & the Virginia Mountaineers:  Favorite Hoe Down Fiddle Hits
CLP-5531...Members of the Charlie Barnet Orchestra: Cherokee: A Tribute To Charlie Barnet
CLP-5532...More Bar Room Singing
CLP-5533...Members of the Woody Herman Orchestra: Woodchopper's Ball: A Tribute to Woody Herman
CLP-5534...
CLP-5535...?
CLP-5536...Scotty Howard: None Other Than Me LP (1964)
CLP-5537...?
CLP-5538...?
CLP-5539...?
CLP-5540...Mexicali Brass: Viva LP (1964?)
CLP-5541...?
CLP-5542...Mexicali Brass: Mame & Hello Dolly LP (1964?)
CLP-5543...?
CLP-5544...The Mexicali Brass: The Shadow of Your Smile LP (1964?)
CLP-5545...?
CLP-5546...?
CLP-5547...?
CLP-5548...?
CLP-5549...The Mountainairs: Good Old Mountain Music LP (1964?)
CLP-5550...?
CLP-5551...?
CLP-5552...?
CLP-5553...Jerry Cole & The Stingers: Guitars a Go-Go Vol. 2 LP (196?)
CLP-5554...Harold Hensley & the Virginia Mountaineers: Hoedown Country LP (1964)
CLP-5555...Red Rhodes: Steel Guitar Rag LP (1964)
CLP-5556...?
CLP-5557...?
CLP-5558...?
CLP-5559...?
CLP-5560...Bobby Lowe: I'm Movin' on & Other Country Favorites LP (196?)
CLP-5561...Hollywood Strings: Hawaii and Other Songs of the Islands
CLP-5562...?
CLP-5563...?
CLP-5564...George Mann, His Group & Orchestra: Born Free LP (196?)
CLP-5565...Johnnie Lee Wills: The Best of Johnnie Lee Wills LP (1964?)
CLP-5566...?
CLP-5567...?
CLP-5568...?
CLP-5569...?
CLP-5570...?
CLP-5571...?
CLP-5572...?
CLP-5573...?
CLP-5574...?
CLP-5575...?
CLP-5576...?
CLP-5577...?
CLP-5578...?
CLP-5579...?
CLP-5580...?
CLP-5581...?
CLP-5582...Foy Willing: C & W Favorites LP (1965)
CLP-5583...Eddie Dean: Sings Country and Western LP (1965)
CLP-5584...?
CLP-5585...?
CLP-5586...?
CLP-5587...?
CLP-5588...?
CLP-5589...The Firebirds: Light My Fire LP (1967 or 1968)
CLP-5590...?
CLP-5591...?
CLP-5592...The 31 Flavors: Hair LP (1968)
CLP-5593...?
CLP-5594...?
CLP-5595...?
CLP-5596...?
CLP-5597...?
CLP-5598...?
CLP-5599...?
CLP-5600...?
CLP-5601...?
CLP-5602...?
CLP-5603...?
CLP-5604...?
CLP-5605...?
CLP-5606...?
CLP-5607...?
CLP-5608...?
CLP-5609...?
CLP-5610...?
CLP-5611...Tennesseans: The Nashville Scene LP (1969?)
CLP-5612...?
CLP-5613...?
CLP-5614...?
CLP-5615...?
CLP-5616...?
CLP-5617...?
CLP-5618...?
CLP-5619...?
CLP-5620...?
CLP-5621...?
CLP-5622...?
CLP-5623...?
CLP-5624...Jimmy Lloyd: Fireball Mail LP (1969?)
CLP-5625...?
CLP-5626...?
CLP-5627...?
CLP-5628...Fascinating Strings: Theme from Love Story LP (1969)
CLP-5629...?
CLP-5630...Etta James: Etta James LP (1969?)
CLP-5631...?
CLP-5632...?
CLP-5633...?
CLP-5634...?
CLP-5635...?
CLP-5636...?
CLP-5637...?
CLP-5638...?
CLP-5639...?
CLP-5640...?
CLP-5641...?
CLP-5642...?
CLP-5643...?
CLP-5644...Dave Clark Five: Dave Clark Five LP (1969)
CMX-300...Rudolph the Red Nosed Reindeer and Other Christmas LP (1961?)
CMX-800...Ivan Ditmar: Joy to the World LP (196?)
CMX-1000...The Mexicali Brass: Christmas with The Mexicali Brass LP (196?)
|}

Stereo

Other Crown Records
 United Kingdom
 Crown Records was a label made by Polyphon before World War I.
 Crown Records was a short-lived label in the mid-1920s that was a successor to the 6-inch "Bell" records made by Edison Bell.
 Crown Records was a label for 9-inch discs sold exclusively in Woolworth stores 1935-1937 through a contract with the Crystalate Manufacturing Company and was related to the Eclipse label.
 United States
 Crown Records (1930s label) was headquartered in New York City in the mid 20th century. 
 Crown Records, launched and headquartered in Virginia Beach, Virginia in the early 2000s, issues records for the square dance community
 Japan based Crown Records, also known as Nippon Crown.
 Hong Kong based Crown Records 娛樂唱片, starting in the early 1960s, produces and issues records of Cantonese opera and Cantopop mainly, Mandopop and Hong Kong English pop in few.

See also
List of record labels

References

External links
 Custom Records - related label - discography
 Nippon Crown Official site (in Japanese'')
 Virginia Beach based Crown Records

Budget record labels
Record labels established in 1957
Defunct record labels